East Surrey College is a general further education college situated in the town of Redhill, Surrey. As of 2014 the college has over 2,500 classroom-based students and 1,000 community learners.

Programs 
 Full-time Qualifications Courses 
 Part-time Qualification Courses 
 Adult Community Learning
 Apprenticeships
 Higher Education

Subject areas 

Subject areas include:

Accounting
 Applied Science
Arts, Crafts, Design & Media
 Business, Information & Communications
 Computing
 Construction: 
Bricklaying
Carpentry
Electrical Installation
Painting & Decorating
Plumbing
 Cooking
Creative Arts
Counselling
ESOL & EFL
 Engineering & Electronics
Fitness & Well-being
Floristry & Horticulture
 Hair, Beauty & Holistic Therapies
 Health, Social Care & Early Years
 Home & Garden
ICT
 Languages
Motor Vehicle
Public Services
Skills for Life
 Sports
 Supported Learning
 Teaching
Travel, Tourism & Airline Operations

The College maintains working relationships with local businesses, professional organisations, local schools and other providers of post-16 education.

College services 
 
A team of advisers are available within the Client Services Department
Learning Support Services
Visual Impairment Support Services. In partnership with the RNIB, the college delivers a Visual Impairment Support Service.

College facilities 

The Learning Resource Centre provides learners with resources suitable for their studies.
The "Escape" Hair, Beauty and Holistic Therapy Salon is open to the public and provides a variety of treatments and services
The studios of the Reigate School of Art, Design & Media provide an environment for students to produce and display their work. The multi-media suites have Apple Macs with the latest graphic software and technology.  The department also encourages students to gain practical experience through its links with local companies and industry bodies such as JAMES and the Music Producers Guild.

East Surrey College opened its new campus facilities in September 2010.

References

External links
 East Surrey College website

Further education colleges in Surrey
Reigate and Banstead